Sidney I. Lezak (November 8, 1924 – April 24, 2006) was an American lawyer who served as the United States Attorney for the District of Oregon from 1961 to 1982. Appointed acting U.S. Attorney by John F. Kennedy in 1961, Lezak resigned in 1982.

Early life and education 
Lezak was born in Chicago, the son of immigrants from the Russian Empire. During World War II, Lezak served as a member of the United States Army Air Forces, retiring with the rank of lieutenant colonel. After the war, Lezak earned a Bachelor of Arts degree in philosophy and a Juris Doctor from the University of Chicago.

Career 
Lezak moved to Portland, Oregon in 1961, where he worked as an attorney and partner in the firm of Bailey, Lezak, Swink & Gates. In 1961, Lezak was nominated to serve as United States Attorney for the District of Oregon by then-president John F. Kennedy. Lezak's nomination was blocked by newly elected senator Maurine Neuberger. From 1961 to 1964, Lezak served as acting United States Attorney until his nomination was again submitted by Lyndon B. Johnson and he was confirmed by the United States Senate. Lezak served until his retirement in 1982. After leaving government, Lezak re-established a private legal practice, specializing on dispute resolution.

Personal life 
Lezak died on April 24, 2006 in Portland, Oregon at the age of 81.

References 
1924 births

2006 deaths
Lawyers from Chicago
Oregon lawyers
United States Attorneys
United States Attorneys for the District of Oregon
University of Chicago alumni
University of Chicago Law School alumni
Lawyers from Portland, Oregon
Military personnel from Illinois